Flavio Montrucchio (born 15 May 1975 in Turin) is an Italian actor and television host.

Biography
In 2001 he wins Grande Fratello (season 2). After that he is an actor both in television (CentoVetrine, Donna detective, Capri 2, Fidati di me, La nuova squadra 3, Baciati dall'amore, Provaci ancora prof! 4) and cinema (Si sente ca sono calabrese? Le avventure di Franco al Nord, 7/8 - Sette ottavi, Il soffio dell'anima, Una donna per amica).

Flavio Montrucchio is also a television host RAI, Discovery anf Fox.

Filmography

Cinema

Television

Theater
 Donna de Paradiso (2003)
 Un viaggiatore perso (2003)
 Grease (2004-2005)
 Aladin - Il musical (2011)
 Sette spose per sette fratelli (2014)

Television
 Grande Fratello (season 2) (Canale 5, 2001)
 (Rai 1, 2012)
 (Rai 1, 2012)
Tale e quale show - Duetti (Rai 1, 2013)
Una notte per Caruso (Rai 1, 2014-2015)
  (Rai 1, 2015)
Zecchino d'Oro (Rai 1, 2015)
L'attesa (Rai 1, 2015)
Castrocaro Music Festival (Rai 1, 2016)
  (Fox Life, 2017-2018)
  (Real Time, 2019-present)
  (Real Time, 2020)
 (Real Time, 2020)
 (Real Time, 2021-present)
 (Discovery+, Real Time, 2021-present)

References

External links
 

Living people
1975 births
Male actors from Rome
21st-century Italian male actors
Italian television presenters